Bartków  is a village in the administrative district of Gmina Wąsosz, within Góra County, Lower Silesian Voivodeship, in south-western Poland. It lies approximately 7 km south-east of Wąsosz, 23 km south-east of Góra, and 47 km north-west of the regional capital Wrocław.

References

Villages in Góra County